Norwegian driving licences (Bokmål: Førerkort, Nynorsk: Førarkort) adhere to a standard set in the European Economic Area.

Obtaining a driving licence 
Minimum age for cars (category B) is 18 years. Mopeds (category AM146; 50 cc, max 45 km/h), smaller motorcycles (category A1; engine capacity equal to, or less than 125 cubic centimetres) and tractors (category T) are 16 years. Most larger truck licences require holder to be 21 years old (category C). Motorcycles have different rules, drivers can drive a motorcycle with up to 35 kW from the age of 18 (category A2), as long as the student have completed the necessary courses and tests. When the student turns 20, the student can take a course for motorcycles with unlimited power (category A) assuming they have the A2 license since the age of 18. Before the driver is 24, they have to have at least 2 years experience with smaller motorcycles.

Driver training 
Before one is allowed to practise for any driving licence, one must first complete a four-day class called  (elementary traffic class) which covers the basic rules of the road, some general advice, and what to do when involved in (or present at the scene of) an accident—including how to communicate effectively with emergency services and basic first aid skills (ABC, recovery position). Students over 25 years of age are exempt from most parts of the elementary traffic class, and therefore they can begin practise driving without taking the class.

Anyone having completed this class and no less than two years younger than the minimum age for the desired licence is allowed to practise drive for that licence if accompanied by a parent or other adult who is at least 25 years old and has had the relevant licence without interruption for the past five years. For example, when the student is 16 years old, they can begin driving training for category B after they completed the class. Some driving schools offer basic training on how to effectively coach a learning driver, but this training is not compulsory.

During practise driving, an L-plate must be affixed behind the car, or on the back of the reflective vest for motorcycles and mopeds. However, if practise driving is being done by licensed instructor, the L-plate is replaced by the black text "" ("School") on white background.

In addition for cars, an additional rear-view mirror used by accompanying adult is also required. For motorcycles and mopeds, they must be able to communicate each other with two-way intercom or mobile phone through headset.

Drivers must also take courses with a licensed instructor in night driving, slippery road driving in an obstacle course, first aid, and four obligatory driving hours each covering different aspects of traffic. One of those is long-distance driving on country roads, another is city driving with roundabouts.

Theory test 
After the student applies for the driving licence to Norwegian Public Roads Administration (Norwegian: Statens Vegvesen), the student must undergo theory test before taking practical test at Vegvesen's Driver and Vehicle Licensing Office (Norwegian: Trafikkstasjon). Before the theory test is taken for the first time, they must do a simple eye exam. The theory test for category B (cars) consists of 45 questions and each question has one correct answer. The student must answer all questions and 85% of correct answers (up to seven wrong answers) will pass this test. After this test is passed, the student must pass the practical test within three years after completion, or the student must retake the test. If the student fails the test, they must wait two weeks before retaking the test.

Practical test 
If the student has succeeded the theory test and all obligatory training courses has been completed, the student takes the practical test before obtaining the licence. The test consists of several parts, including safety check with the vehicle before the start of the journey and parking at the end of the journey. The student are legally considered as driver and they are responsible what they have to do during the test. Once the test is ended, the examiner will tell them they've passed or failed the test. If they pass this test, they will be photographed and pay for licence issue fee. They can choose either to be mailed on their registered address, or to be picked up at the office. If they chose to pick it up at the office, the licence must be picked up within five years. If they fail the test, they must wait four weeks before retaking the test and reason for the failure is written.

After the licence is obtained 
When the driver first gets their licence they get what is called a trial licence which is a 2-year trial period during which the number of points they will receive is doubled for each traffic violations, making it easier to lose their licence. If the driver loses their licence during this period, they have to retake all the tests, both theoretically and practically after the suspension period is expired. If the driver loses their licence after the 2-year trial, they will receive the licence by mail when it is reissued to their address after the suspension period is expired.

Point system 
Since January 1, 2004, the point system (Norwegian: Prikkbelastning) is used by Norwegian authorities to handle traffic offenders. Two points will be issued for most violations except for in the smallest speeding cases. If eight points or more is issued during a three-year period, the driving licence is temporarily suspended, usually for six months. All points will be removed after three years since points is first received in this period. If the licence is reissued after suspension period, all points are removed immediately.

Cost 
In Norway it is not unusual to end up paying 25,000 to 30,000 NOK (≈4,000 USD as of December 2014 ) for a driving licence. This is owing to the vast number of courses required.

See also 

 European driving licence
 Driving Licence
 European Commissioner for Transport
 International driving licence
Datakortet

References 

Norway
Road transport in Norway